Frankfield railway station was the terminus of a 21-mile railway branch line from May Pen serving the eponymous market town,  from the Kingston terminus. It opened in 1925 with the completion of the final 9¼ mile extension on the branch, and closed in 1974 when the branch itself closed due to a lack of maintenance. It has since been demolished.

See also
Railway stations in Jamaica

References

Bibliography

External links
Aerial view.

Railway stations in Jamaica
Buildings and structures in Clarendon Parish, Jamaica
Railway stations opened in 1925
Railway stations closed in 1974